Snam S.p.A. is an Italian energy infrastructure company. 
As of 31 December 2019, it had a market capitalization of €15.4 billion. 
Snam was originally a subsidiary of Italian energy company Eni. 
It has since become an independent company, whose largest shareholder is CDP Reti, a holding company controlled by the Italian state.
The utility operates in Italy and, through associated companies, in Albania (AGSCo), Austria (TAG, GCA), China (Snam Gas & Energy Services Beijing), France (Terēga), Greece (DESFA), the UAE (Adnoc Gas Pipelines) and the United Kingdom (Interconnector UK). It is one of the main shareholders of the Trans Adriatic Pipeline (TAP).
Snam is the main Italian operator for the transport and dispatching of natural gas in Italy, having almost all the transport infrastructures in Italy, with 32,727 km of gas pipelines in operation in high and medium pressure (approximately 94% of the entire transport) and over 41,000 km including international activities. First in Europe for natural gas storage capacity (over 20 billion cubic meters, including international activities), the company is also one of the main continental operators in regasification for a total pro quota capacity of approximately 8.5 billion cubic meters per year.

Snam is one of Europe's main regulated gas companies - leading Italy in gas transport and storage, while ranking third in regasification.  Snam also aims to invest in new energy transition businesses to reduce environmental impact and decarbonisation: sustainable mobility (compressed – CNG and bio-CNG – and liquefied – LNG and bio-LNG – natural gas distributors, Small Scale LNG), energy efficiency, renewable gases such as biomethane and hydrogen.
The company is listed on the FTSE MIB index of the Borsa Italiana since 6 December 2001.

History
Snam was founded on 30 October 1941 in San Donato Milanese, Lombardy, with the name Società Nazionale Metanodotti.

On 1 June 2001, it changed its name to Snam Rete Gas. 
It has been traded on the Borsa Italiana since 6 December 2001. 
On 1 January 2012, it was renamed with the original name of Snam.

In April 2019, Snam launched the first injection of a hydrogen and natural gas into the pipeline, the Europe's first commercial test of a hydrogen-methane blend in a high-pressure network.

Subsidiaries
Snam has following subsidiaries:

 Snam Rete Gas S.p.A.: the transmission system operator for natural gas;
 Stogit S.p.A.: storage of natural gas;
 GNL Italia S.p.A.: for the regasification of liquefied natural gas.
 Snam4Mobility: promotes the development of natural gas in the form of CNG (compressed natural gas), LNG (liquefied natural gas) and biomethane (100% renewable gas) as a clean, efficient and competitive fuel for light and heavy vehicles. It controls Cubogas (100%)
 Snam 4 Environment: promotes biogas and biomethane infrastructures development through its subsidiaries Renerwaste, (83%), IES Biogas (70%) and Enersi Sicilia (100%)
 TEP Energy Solution (82%): one of Italy's leading enterprises in the energy efficiency sector
 Teréga, a French gas pipeline company which operates gas pipelines and storage facilities in France.

Operations
In Italy, Snam is responsible for natural gas transportation,dispatching and storage as well as regasification of liquefied natural gas (LNG). Snam's assets include:

 Transmission network: 32,767 km;
 Compressor stations: 13;
 Points of entry into the national network for imported gas: 9;
 m3 of total storage capacity: 17 bmc;
 Regasification terminal: 1.

Investments:

 Vision to 2030: 23 billion euros of investment opportunities in the 2021-2030 period in three growth areas (energy networks, energy storage and green energy projects).

Peers/competitors:

 Terna Group - the main electricity grid owner in Italy, responsible for high voltage electricity transmission and dispatching nationwide 
 Enagás - Technical Manager of the Spanish gas System and the main carrier of natural gas
 Red Eléctrica de España (REE): manages the Spanish transmission grid and acts as sole transmission agent; it is also the System Operator
 National Grid (UK): operates in the regulated businesses of transmission and distribution of electricity and gas mainly in the United Kingdom and northeastern United States

Market share:

Shareholders structure

Board of directors

Appointed by the Shareholders' Meeting in April 2022

Sustainability

Snam's approach to sustainability is based on Shared Value, a concept elaborated by Michael E. Porter in collaboration with Mark R. Kramer that explores the link between a company and its environment and their mutual interdependence. In order to create Shared Value, Snam promotes sustainable development and ESG (Environment, Social, Governance) factors integration along its entire transport, dispatchment, regasification, storage and distribution process. Snam adopts an ESG Committee, made up of independent members of the board with advisory function on the link between corporate performance and environmental, social and governance factors.

In 2009 the company joined the United Nations Global Compact and since 2006 has published a sustainability report in accordance with the Global Reporting Initiative's guidelines. 
Since 2015 Snam also has published an Integrated Report, inspired by International Integrated Report Council (IIRC) principles, inside the Annual Report, and since 2018 Snam has published the Non Financial Statement according Italian Dlgs. 254 still inside Annual Report.
Moreover, Snam has adhered to the Task Force on Climate-related Financial Disclosures (TCFD) in 2018 and published its first document about Climate change, “Snam for the future”.

Snam operates within the reference framework of the United Nations Universal Declaration of Human Rights, the Fundamental Conventions of the ILO and the OECD Guidelines on Multinational Enterprises.

Its commitment towards the environment focuses on the reduction of greenhouse gas emissions and safeguarding biodiversity. Among its social initiatives, Snam partners with Legambiente and Federparchi and, in 2012, joined the Sodalitas Foundation, which seeks to build bridges between the entrepreneurial world in Italy and the non-profit sector.

In 2017 Snam established its corporate foundation – Fondazione Snam - with the aim of contributing to the social, cultural and economic growth of areas affected by Snam's activities or marked by social inequality.

See also

 Società Sportiva Metanopoli
 2022 Russia–European Union gas dispute, in which EU member states sought to rapidly exclude natural gas imports from Russia following Russia's invasion of Ukraine

References

External links

Oil and gas companies of Italy
Companies listed on the Borsa Italiana
Energy companies established in 1941
Italian companies established in 1941
Italian brands
Eni
Government-owned companies of Italy
Partly privatized companies of Italy